Leslaine Lambert (born 13 August 1958) is a Guyanese cricketer. He played in eighteen first-class and six List A matches for Guyana from 1978 to 1987.

See also
 List of Guyanese representative cricketers

References

External links
 

1958 births
Living people
Guyanese cricketers
Guyana cricketers